The 1959–60 Cypriot First Division was the 22nd season of the Cypriot top-level football league.

Overview
It was contested by 11 teams, and Anorthosis Famagusta FC won the championship.

League standings

Results

References
Cyprus - List of final tables (RSSSF)

Cypriot First Division seasons
Cypriot
1